The 2007 Pro Tour season was the twelfth season of the Magic: The Gathering Pro Tour. On 9 February 2007 the season began with Pro Tour Geneva. It ended on 9 December 2007 with the conclusion of the 2007 World Championship in New York. The season consisted of 16 Grand Prixs and 5 Pro Tours, held in Geneva, Yokohama, San Diego, Valencia, and New York. At the end of the season Tomoharu Saitou from Japan was proclaimed Pro Player of the year. At the Worlds in New York the third class of the Hall of Fame was inducted. The inductees were Kai Budde, Zvi Mowshowitz, Tsuyoshi Fujita, Nicolai Herzog, and Randy Buehler.

Pro Tour – Geneva (9–11 February 2007) 

Mike Hron of the United States won the Pro Tour, defeating Takuya Oosawa in the Japanese player's second finals appearance. Willy Edel of Brazil became the first South American player with three top eight finishes, and former of player of the year Kenji Tsumura reached the quarter finals for the fifth time.

Tournament data 
Prize pool: $240,245
Players: 387
Format: Booster Draft (Time Spiral-Planar Chaos)
Head Judge: David Vogin

Top 8

Final standings

Grand Prixs – Dallas, Singapore, Amsterdam, Kyoto, Massachusetts

GP Dallas (24–25 February)
Format: Extended
Attendance: 748
 Raphaël Lévy
 Paul Cheon
 Kenji Tsumura
 John Pelcak
 Mark Herberholz
 Paul Nguyen
 Alex Ledbetter
 Jim Davis

GP Singapore (3–4 March)
Format: Extended
Attendance: 331
 Raphaël Lévy
 Shingou Kurihara
 Antoine Ruel
 Osamu Fujita
 Olivier Ruel
 Koutarou Ootsuka
 Ryou Ogura
 Tomoharu Saitou

GP Amsterdam (10–11 March)
Format: Two-headed Giant Limited
Attendance: 1336 (668 teams)
 Richard Hornansky Michael Havlik
 Amiel Tenenbaum Gabriel Nassif
 Olaf Koster Christian Kok
 Vassilis Fatouros  Georgios Kapalos

GP Kyoto (17–18 March)
Format: Standard
Attendance: 859
 Yuuya Watanabe
 Yuusuke Iwasaki
 Motokiyo Azuma
 Tsubasa Tomii
 Naoki Shimizu
 Ren Ishikawa
 Atsushi Wada
 Katsuhiro Ide

GP Massachusetts (31 March – 1 April)
Format: Two-Headed Giant Limited
Attendance: 690 (345 teams)
 Matt Wang Steven O'Mahoney-Schwartz
 Gerard Fabiano Eric Ziegler
 Ben Lundquist Timothy Aten
 Matt Rubin Rob DiPalma

Pro Tour – Yokohama (20–22 April 2007) 

Frenchman Guillaume Wafo-Tapa won the second Pro Tour of the year, emerging from a Top eight in which every other contestant has at least twice appeared in a PT final eight. Masashi Oiso became only the fifth player to reach the quarter finals more than five times, Portugal's Paulo Carvalho put up his second top eight in three events, and Raphaël Lévy continued his hot streak with his first Pro Tour top eight since 1999.

Tournament data 
Prize pool: $240,245
Players: 387
Format: Time Spiral Block Constructed
Head Judge: Sheldon Menery

Top 8

Final standings

Grands Prix – Stockholm, Columbus, Strasbourg, Montreal

GP Stockholm (5–6 May)
Format: Limited
Attendance: 713
 Nicolay Potovin
 André Müller
 Kenji Tsumura
 Oliver Oks
 Bas Postema
 Thomas Refsdal
 Klaus Jöns
 Samuel Korsell

GP Columbus (19–20 May)
Format: Legacy
Attendance: 883
 Steve Sadin
 Owen Turtenwald
 Bill Stark
 Max Tietze
 Gadiel Szleifer
 Paul Nicolo
 Ryan Trepanier
 Michael Belfatto

GP Strasbourg (19–20 May)
Format: Block Constructed
Attendance: 1155
 Tomoharu Saitou
 Raul Porojan
 Shouta Yasooka
 Florian Pils
 Christoph Huber
 Klaus Jöns
 Petr Martinek
 Stefan Heigerer

GP Montreal (23–24 June)
Format: Block Constructed
Attendance: 739
 Celso Zampere Jr.
 Paul Cheon
 Guillaume Wafo-Tapa
 Kenji Tsumura
 Gabriel Schwarz
 Koutarou Ootsuka
 Jason Imperiale
 Shouta Yasooka

Pro Tour – San Diego (29 June – 1 July 2007) 

Pro Tour San Diego was the inaugural and as yet only event for the Two-Headed Giant format at the Pro Tour level. Chris Lachmann and Jacob van Lunen won the tournament, both in their first Pro Tour, playing an innovative sliver strategy. They won the elimination bracket in a combined nine turns making it the shortest semi-final and final ever.

Tournament data 
Prize pool: $240,500
Players: 390 (195 teams)
Format: Two-Headed Giant Booster Draft (Time Spiral-Planar Chaos-Future Sight)
Head Judge: Toby Elliott

Top 4

Final standings

Grand Prixs – San Francisco, Florence

GP San Francisco (25–26 August)
Format: Block Constructed
Attendance: 672
 Luis Scott-Vargas
 Jonathan Stocks
 Paulo Vitor Damo da Rosa
 Brett Blackmann
 David Irvine
 Andrew Walden
 Zack Smith
 Paul Cheon

GP Florence (8–9 September)
Format: Block Constructed
Attendance: 1082
 Masami Kaneko
 André Coimbra
 Marco Cammilluzzi
 Mido Kagawa
 Armin Birner
 Manuel Bucher
 Rasmus Sibast
 Ronald Guetl

Pro Tour – Valencia (12–14 October 2007) 

Pro Tour Valencia began with a bumpy start. The first day of play to be canceled due to flooding. On the other two days the schedule had to be altered somewhat, including additional rounds on Saturday and three rounds on Sunday before Top 8. In the end, Frenchman Remi Fortier defeated Germany's André Müller in the final, making Valencia the third consecutive extended Pro Tour to be won by a French player.

Tournament data 
Prize pool: $240,245
Players: 424
Format: Extended
Head Judge: Jaap Brouwer

Top 8

Final standings

Grand Prixs – Brisbane, Bangkok, Krakow, Kitakyuushuu, Daytona Beach

GP Brisbane (20–21 October)
Format: Limited
Attendance: 233
 Anatoli Lightfoot
 Shawn Rayson
 André Coimbra
 Hassan Kamel
 David Zhao
 Norman McPherson
 Andrew Eckermann
 Chris Ninnes

GP Bangkok (27–28 October)
Format: Limited
Attendance: 314
 Masahiko Morita
 Shingou Kurihara
 Yong Han Choo
 Kok Seng Ong
 Junya Iyanaga
 Koutarou Ootsuka
 Steven Tan
 Takuya Oosawa

GP Kraków (3–4 November)
Format: Standard
Attendance: 849
 Paul Cheon
 Amiel Tenenbaum
 Armin Birner
 Olivier Ruel
 Robert Jacko
 David Besso
 Guillaume Wafo-Tapa
 Matej Zatlkaj

GP Kitakyuushuu (10–11 November)
Format: Limited
Attendance: 354
 Junya Iyanaga
 Shouta Yasooka
 Akira Asahara
 Olivier Ruel
 Kazuya Hirabayashi
 Jun Young Park
 Kenji Tsumura
 Chih-Chun Tsai

GP Daytona Beach (17–18 November)
Format: Limited
Attendance: 636
 Seth Manfield
 Paulo Vitor Damo da Rosa
 Tillman Bragg
 Tanon Grace
 Gabe Walls
 Steven Wolansky
 Kyle Miller
 Alex Lieberman

2007 World Championships – New York City (6–9 December 2007) 

The World Championships began with the induction of the third class into the hall of fame. The inductees were Kai Budde, Zvi Mowshowitz, Tsuyoshi Fujita, Nicolai Herzog, and Randy Buehler. In the individual competition Uri Peleg became the first Israeli, not only to reach the top eight, but also to win a Pro Tour. For Mori it was his third consecutive Worlds Top 8 appearance. In the team competition, the Swiss defeated the Austrian team in the finals

Tournament data 

Prize pool: $215,600 (individual) + $192,200 (national teams)
Players: 386
Formats: Standard, Booster Draft (Lorwyn), Legacy
Head Judge: Mike Guptil

Top 8

Final standings

National team competition 

  Switzerland (Nico Bohny, Manuel Bucher, Raphael Genari, Christoph Huber)
  Austria (Thomas Preyer, Stefan Stradner, David Reitbauer, Helmut Summersberger)

Pro Player of the year final standings 

After the World Championship Tomoharu Saitou was awarded the Pro Player of the year title.

Performance by country 

Japan players dominated the season, making 16 Top 8 appearances although they had only about half as many players on the Pro Tour as the United States, which had the secondmost Top 8 appearances at 9. Both countries generated 21 level 4+ pro players in this season. For the Netherlands despite having generated 7 level 4+ pro players in the season success on the Pro Tour was almost elusive with a single 8th place being their only Top 8 appearance.

T8 = Number of players from that country appearing in a Pro Tour Top 8; Q* = Number of players from that country participating in Pro Tours (PT San Diego is missing as no country breakdown is available for that event); GT = Gravy Trainers (aka players with a Pro Players Club level of 4 or more) from that country generated in the 2007 season; Best Player (PPts) = Player with the most Pro Points from that country, Pro Points of that player in brackets.

References 

Magic: The Gathering professional events